Narputta Nangala Jugadai (1933–2010) was an Aboriginal Australian artist born at Karrkurutinytja, who later lived at Haasts Bluff (Ikuntji) in the Northern Territory. Her language group was Pintupi/Pitjantjatjara, and her Dreaming was "Snake", "Jangala, Two Men" and "Two Women". She was a senior artist in her community at Ikuntji and prominent among the Ikuntji Women's Centre (later Ikuntji Artists) painters. She was the wife of  the painter, Timmy Tjungurrayi Jugadai, and mother of Daisy Jugadai Napaltjarri and Molly Jugadai Napaltjarri.

Her work Karrkurutinytja  (a depiction of her birthplace) is held in the Art Gallery of New South Wales.

Seven works are held in the National Gallery of Victoria, four again entitled Kaakurutinytja (Lake MacDonald), in addition to the works: One Jakamarra, 1995, Ngurrapalangu, 1994,  and Tjangala kutjarra, kuniya kutjarra, Kaakurutinytja, 1996. The Art Gallery of South Australia holds an untitled 1996 work. The Art Gallery of Western Australia also holds a painting entitled Karrkurutinytja.

She had exhibitions at the Campbelltown Art Centre and at the Museum of Contemporary Aboriginal Art as well as galleries in Brisbane and Melbourne.   

In May 1995, her works were included in the group exhibition, Minyma Tjukurrpa, including her collaboration with artists from Nampitjinpa Women of Kintore and other Ikuntji artists as part of the Kintor/Haast's Bluff Art Project. 

In April 1996, he works were included in the group exhibition, Miracles of the Desert: three artists form the Ikuuntji Women's Centre, along with Eunice Napanangka and Daisy Jugadai.

In April 1997, her work was included in the group exhibition, Ikuntji Tjuta In Canberra. She attended the opening of this exhibition in Canberra with fellow Ikuntji artist, Alice Nampitjinpa. 

Her work, Karrakuurrutinytja, 1997 was featured in the 14th National Aboriginal and Torres Strait Islander Art Award.    

Her work was included in the group exhibition of paintings from the Ikuntji Women's Centre, Haasts Bluff, Northern Territory, Inkuntji Tjuta, at the Campbelltown City Bicentennial Art Gallery in October 1999.  

In June 2001, Narputta and fellow Ikuntji artist, Katungha Napanangka held a joint exhibition of recent paintings at the Gallery Gabrielle Pizzi, Melbourne.

From 18 April to 16 June 2002, Narputta was included in the group exhibition, Spirit Country: Contemporary Australian Aboriginal Art from the Gantner Meyer Collection, exhibited at the Brisbane City Gallery. Her standout pieces included her two versions of Two Women (1997) used 'repetitive horizontal bands of hills signifying a long journey'.

Her work, Goanna dreaming, sold at Christies in 2005 for $US 2677. In 1997 she won the Open Painting section of the Telstra National Aboriginal & Torres Strait Islander Art Awards.

DACS represents Narputta Nangala with respect to copyright licensing.

See also 
Molly Jugadai Napaltjarri
Daisy Jugadai Napaltjarri

References

External links 
Art sales Digest (Many images of her work)
Information about sale of the painting, Two carpet snakes

Australian Aboriginal artists
1933 births
2010 deaths